A constitutional plebiscite was held in the Philippines on 2 February 1987. The plebiscite is pursuant to Presidential Proclamation No. 3 which was issued on 25 March 1986 by President Corazon Aquino. It abolished the Office of the Prime Minister and the Regular Batasang Pambansa (English: National Assembly). Multi-party elections were held accordingly in 1987.

Background of the new constitution
In 1986, following the People Power Revolution which ousted Ferdinand Marcos as president, and following her own inauguration, Corazon Aquino issued Proclamation No. 3, declaring a national policy to implement the reforms mandated by the people, protecting their basic rights, adopting a provisional constitution, and providing for an orderly transition to a government under a new constitution.
President Aquino later issued Proclamation No. 9, creating a Constitutional Commission (popularly abbreviated as "ConCom" in the Philippines) to frame a new constitution to replace the 1973 Constitution, which took effect during the martial law regime of her predecessor. President Aquino appointed 50 members to the Commission. The members of the Commission were drawn from varied backgrounds, including several former senators and congressmen, a former Supreme Court Chief Justice (Roberto Concepcion), a Catholic bishop (Teodoro Bacani), and a noted film director (Lino Brocka). President Aquino also deliberately appointed five members, including former Labor Minister Blas Ople, who had been allied with President Marcos until the latter's ouster. After the Commission had convened, it elected as its president Cecilia Muñoz-Palma, who had emerged as a leading figure in the anti-Marcos opposition following her retirement as  the first female Associate Justice of the Supreme Court.

The Commission finished the draft charter within four months after it was convened. Several issues were heatedly debated during the sessions, including on the form of government to adopt, the abolition of the death penalty, the continued retention of the Clark and Subic American military bases, and the integration of economic policies into the Constitution. Brocka walked out of the Commission before its completion (formally resigning on August 28, 1986), and two other delegates dissented from the final draft. The ConCom completed their task on October 12, 1986 and presented the draft constitution to President Aquino on October 15, 1986. After a period of nationwide information campaign, a plebiscite for its ratification was held on February 2, 1987. More than three-fourths of all votes cast were for ratification. Thus, it was on February 2, 1987 that the 1987 Constitution took effect. On February 11, 1987, President Aquino, other government officials, and the Armed Forces of the Philippines, pledged allegiance to the Constitution. Since then, February 2 has been celebrated as Constitution Day, the date of the plebiscite.

Results

Summary

By region

See also
Commission on Elections
Politics of the Philippines
Philippine elections
Philippine Constitution

References

External links
 Official website of the Commission on Elections
 Constitution of the Republic of the Philippines

1987 elections in the Philippines
1987 referendums
Constitutional referendums in the Philippines
Presidency of Corazon Aquino